Oberriet railway station is a railway station in Oberriet, in the Swiss canton of St. Gallen. It is an intermediate stop on the Chur–Rorschach line.

Services 
Oberriet is served by the S4 of the St. Gallen S-Bahn:

 : hourly service via Sargans (circular operation).

References

External links 
 
 

Railway stations in the canton of St. Gallen
Swiss Federal Railways stations